KKLR-FM (94.5 FM, "Clear 94") is a radio station licensed to serve Poplar Bluff, Missouri.  The station is owned by Max Media. It airs a country music format. KKLR serves Poplar Bluff, southeast Missouri and extreme northeast Arkansas. KKLR's signal can be heard from West Plains, Missouri to Union City, Tennessee and from Farmington, Missouri to Osceola, Arkansas.

The station was assigned the KKLR call letters by the Federal Communications Commission on August 31, 1989.

Ownership
In December 2003, Mississippi River Radio, acting as Max Media LLC (John Trinder, president/COO), reached an agreement to purchase WCIL, WCIL-FM, WUEZ, WXLT, WOOZ-FM, WJPF, KGIR, KZIM, KEZS-FM, KCGQ-FM, KMAL, KLSC, KWOC, KJEZ, KKLR-FM, KGKS, and KSIM from the Zimmer Radio Group (James L. Zimmer, owner). The reported value of this 17 station transaction was $43 million.

References

External links
KKLR official website

KLR
Country radio stations in the United States
Butler County, Missouri
Radio stations established in 1989
Max Media radio stations
1989 establishments in Missouri